SM City CDO Uptown, formerly known as SM City Cagayan de Oro, is a shopping mall owned and operated by SM Prime Holdings, the largest mall operator in the Philippines. It is the first SM Supermall in Northern Mindanao. The mall, which is surrounded by subdivisions and condominiums, is located along Fr. Masterson Avenue corner Gran Via Street, Pueblo de Oro Township, Uptown Carmen, Cagayan de Oro, Misamis Oriental.

In June 2022, the mall was renamed to SM City CDO Uptown, apparently to distinguish it from SM CDO Downtown Premier, which is also located in the city. It is the first mall to bear the new SM logo.

Physical details

Main Mall
The main mall with a gross floor area of 87,837 square meters features major and minor anchors such as SM Store, SM Supermarket, Cyberzone, SM Appliance Center, Ace Hardware, Toy Kingdom, and four SM Cinemas. It has service centers, specialty stores and restaurants. It also has indoor and outdoor parking spaces. Some tenants were already moved to the Northwing building to make way for the major renovation and expansion of the main mall building, which is now ongoing.

Car park
The four-storey car park building was converted to housing apparel stores on its first level and a kart racing track on its roof deck.

Northwing
The four-storey Northwing with a gross floor area of 12,000 square meters and a gross leasable area of 8,000 square meters is an expansion building of SM City CDO Uptown. The first floor is filled with restaurants and shops, while the second floor is filled with salons. The building has over 300 parking spaces located on its third and fourth floors.

The Northwing features drive thru outlets on both sides, namely Starbucks on the Masterson side and Missy Bon Bon on the Beacon side. With The Northwing’s design, SM fulfills the need for safe and breathable spaces as it incorporates open-air dining areas and pockets of lush greenery. It also raises the sense of well-being by providing a refreshing, leisurely experience to meet the changing lifestyle of today’s customers.

The Northwing opened on June 30, 2022.

Vail Residences
The first SMDC project in Cagayan de Oro, it is located across SM City CDO Uptown.

References

Shopping malls in Cagayan de Oro
Shopping malls established in 2002
SM Prime
Buildings and structures in Cagayan de Oro